Allied Forces Northern Europe (AFNORTH) was the northern Major Subordinate Command of NATO's Allied Command Europe (ACE), located at Kolsås outside Oslo. In the case of war with the Soviet Union, AFNORTH would assume supreme command of all Allied forces in northern Europe (Norway and Denmark) and Germany north of Elbe/Hamburg and adjacent sea territory.

History
For much of its existence its commander-in-chief (CINCNORTH) was a British Admiral or General. The chief-of-staff was always a German Vice Admiral. The central Air Force Commander Northern Europe, who would assume command of all NATO air forces in AFNORTH's area in the case of war, was directly subordinated to CINCNORTH and was always a general from the U.S. Air Force. The leadership of AFNORTH additionally included a Land Deputy, a Sea Deputy, and an Air Deputy, who were for a period Danish or Norwegian Major Generals or Rear Admirals.

Headquarters Allied Air Forces Northern Europe was created by SHAPE on 29 March 1951. Major General R.K. Taylor, U.S. Air Force, was assigned as its commander on 2 April 1951. The Headquarters was established in London on 1 June 1951 and later transferred to Oslo, Norway on 22 June 1951. By June 1952 no units had been earmarked or allocated for it. Major General Homer L. Sanders held command September 1954-September 1957. Major General Carl D. Peterson became Air Deputy in June 1977.

Until the formation of BALTAP around 1962, AFNORTH comprised Allied Land Forces Norway, Allied Land Forces Denmark, and Allied Air Forces and Allied Naval Forces, Northern Europe (four commands).

In 1989 at the end of the Cold War AFNORTH's major subordinate commands were Allied Forces North Norway; Allied Forces South Norway; and Allied Forces Baltic Approaches (Karup). BALTAP comprised AIRBALTAP, NAVBALTAP, LANDZEALAND, responsible for the land defence of Zealand and the other Danish islands, and Allied Land Forces Schleswig-Holstein and Jutland (LANDJUT). From 1962 LANDJUT had been responsible for the land defence of the Baltic Approaches from a headquarters at Rendsburg, Germany. LANDJUT comprised the 6th Panzergrenadier Division and the Danish Jutland Division. LANDJUT was planned to be reinforced in time of war by the United Kingdom Mobile Force, primarily 1st Infantry Brigade and the US Army's 9th Infantry Division. In case of war with the Warsaw Pact AFNORTH would have moved its headquarter to the subterranean command center at Kolsås.

HQ AFNORTH Kolsås closed on the morning of 30 June 1994. The HQ that replaced it, HQ Allied Forces Northwestern Europe (AFNORTHWEST), located at RAF High Wycombe in the United Kingdom, was activated in the afternoon of 30 June 1994. AFNORTHWEST directed three Principal Subordinate Commanders: Commander Allied Air Forces Northwestern Europe (COMAIRNORTHWEST), Commander Allied Naval Forces Northwestern Europe (COMNAVNORTHWEST) (the former EASTLANT/CINCHAN), and Commander Allied Forces Northern Europe (COMNORTH), an amalgamation of Allied Forces North and South Norway. In addition, in various circumstances Baltic Approaches naval forces would report to either CINCNORTHWEST or COMNAVNORTHWEST.

AFCENT, located in Brunssum in the Netherlands, was renamed AFNORTH. AFNORTHWEST was disestablished on 3 March 2000, CINCNORTHWEST transferring his authority to RHQ AFNORTH the same day. In the year 2004, it was again renamed, to Joint Force Command Brunssum.

The headquarters facility at Kolsås is now used by the Norwegian defence logistics organization.

Structure until 1993

 Allied Command Europe, in Mons, Belgium
 Allied Forces Northern Europe (AFNORTH) in Kolsås, Norway
 US Army Element at Headquarters Allied Forces Northern Europe (AFNORTH), in Kolsås
 Jåttå Detachment, Region II, 650th Military Intelligence Group (Allied Command Europe (ACE) Counterintelligence Activity), in Stavanger
 US Air Force Element at Headquarters AFNORTH, in Kolsås
 7240th Air Base Squadron, in Østerås
 Detachment 1, 2176th Communications Group, in Kolsås
 Detachment 3, 1141st USAF Special Activities Squadron, in Kolsås
Other national and service elements at HQ AFNORTH
 Allied Forces North Norway (NON)* in Bodø, Norway
 Allied Forces South Norway (SONOR)* in Stavanger, Norway
 Allied Forces Baltic Approaches (BALTAP) in Karup, Denmark
 Allied Land Forces Schleswig-Holstein and Jutland (COMLANDJUT), in Rendsburg, Germany
 Allied Land Forces in Zealand (COMLANDZEALAND) in Ringsted, Denmark
 Allied Air Forces Baltic Approaches (COMAIRBALTAP) in Karup
 Allied Naval Forces Baltic Approaches (COMNAVBALTAP) in Karup

* The sub-commands of NON and SONOR were national Norwegian commands.

Structure 2000-2004 
 AFNORTH at this point was a regional command of AFCENT:
 Two component commands:
 Allied Air Forces North (AIRNORTH) at Ramstein Air Base, Germany;
 Allied Naval Forces North (NAVNORTH) at the Northwood Headquarters, London, United Kingdom.
 Three Joint Sub-regional commands:
 Joint Command Centre in Heidelberg, Germany;
 Joint Command North-East in Karup, Denmark;
 Joint Command North in Stavanger, Norway

The command alternated between British and German generals.

Commanders-in-Chief
Commanders-in-Chief have been:

1951-1953 Admiral Sir Patrick Brind
1953-1956 General Sir Robert Mansergh
1956-1958 Lieutenant General Sir Cecil Sugden
1958-1961 Lieutenant General Sir Horatius Murray
1961-1963 Lieutenant General Sir Harold Pyman
1963-1967 Lieutenant General Sir Robert Bray
1967-1969 General Sir Kenneth Darling
1969-1972 General Sir Walter Walker
1972-1974 General Sir Thomas Pearson
1974-1977 General Sir John Sharp
1977-1979 General Sir Peter Whiteley
1979-1982 General Sir Anthony Farrar-Hockley
1982-1986 General Sir Richard Lawson
1986-1989 General Sir Geoffrey Howlett
1989-1992 General Sir Patrick Palmer
1992-1994 General Sir Garry Johnson

References

Formations of the NATO Military Command Structure 1952–1994
Military units and formations established in 1952
Military units and formations disestablished in 1994